Park Hill Recreation Ground is a  park near the centre of Croydon, Greater London, managed by the London Borough of Croydon. It runs from Barclay Road to Coombe Road beside the railway line, with the main entrances on Water Tower Hill and Barclay Road. The nearest stations (equidistant to the park) are East Croydon to the north for Tramlink and National Rail services and South Croydon to the south for National Rail. The park was officially renamed as Park Hill in 1964.

At the southern end, at the very top of the hill which forms the park, it joins the grounds of Coombe Cliff once the home of members of the Horniman Tea family. From there a steep drive winds down to Coombe Road where a footpath leads to South Croydon railway station for National Rail. The grounds now form part of the park and are open to the public, but the house itself, is not. , it is used for educational purposes. Where the drive meets Coombe Road there is a further entrance and a gatehouse, which is now privately owned for residential purposes. The house is grade II listed.

Previously the site of a reservoir, the land became a public park in the 1880s. The park contains standard amenities, including refreshments and sports facilities, as well as a walled herb garden.

In his memoirs, the Chronicles of Wasted Time (1973), Malcolm Muggeridge recalls the park as a childhood playground where he and his father often walked together and discussed socialism and world affairs.

Croydon Water Tower

The park is the site of the historic Croydon Water Tower. Built in 1867, it ceased to provide water to higher areas of the borough in 1923. , the building is grade II listed, but is disused and not open to the public.

The park was the site of Croydon Reservoir, built in 1851.

Cotelands 

Cotelands is a small park near Park Hill, also managed by the London Borough of Croydon. It covers an area of 0.20 hectares. It is really just a green on the corner of Cotelands and The Avenue, next to Park Hill Junior School and near Archbishop Tenison's School.

Gallery

See also 
Park Hill Junior School
List of parks and open spaces in Croydon
Croydon parks and open spaces
Addiscombe Recreation Ground
Addiscombe Linear Park

References

External links

Croydon Council Park Hill Recreation Ground
Croydon Council - Cotelands
 

Parks and open spaces in the London Borough of Croydon
Urban public parks in the United Kingdom